Acorn is a farm-based, anarchist, egalitarian, intentional community located in rural Louisa County, Virginia, United States. It is a member of the Federation of Egalitarian Communities. Acorn was started in 1993 as a spin-off community of the older, larger Twin Oaks Community. In the early 1990s, the Twin Oaks population swelled to capacity, with many more people who still wished to join. The rapid increase of people put pressure on the community, eventually encouraging the founding of Acorn by Twin Oaks members on a 75-acre farm 7 miles away from Twin Oaks

Community
Group meetings are held weekly and decisions are reached through consensus. Members share a strong sense of environmental awareness, therefore they strive to live lightly on the land. Although structured in areas such as membership, policies are kept to a minimum; it is preferred that calm anarchy prevail. Of the policies that are in place, the culture encourages personal responsibility rather than supervision. The community takes on issues on a case-by-case basis, keeping in mind that needs are varied amongst individuals.

The population and stability of Acorn have fluctuated significantly in its relatively short history. The Financial crisis and interpersonal conflict have brought the community close to an end on a number of occasions. Having survived these difficult times, Acorn is now thriving (2013) as it enjoys full membership of 30 members (currently its self-imposed maximum number) as well as the presence and participation of provisional members, interns and guests.  There is also a waiting list of people who have been approved for membership and are waiting for space to become available.

Acorn supports itself through its non-GMO heirloom seed business, Southern Exposure Seed Exchange. The income from this business is held in common and used to support Acorn's members, as well as a number of other activities (such as maintenance of a fund to support the formation of other cooperative egalitarian communities). In this vein, Acorn purchased a nearby property in 2013, in order to form and support the growth of a new community, which is named Sapling.

All members enjoy full medical, dental, and optical care, as well as a monthly stipend.

Acorn has a highly flexible self-directed labor system in keeping with its philosophy of non-hierarchy and personal independence coupled with personal responsibility. The work of the seed business is done by a dynamic and flexible collection of members and guests who attend to the necessary work tasks based on the varying needs of the business as well as the abilities and inclinations of the participants. Being non-hierarchical, there are no bosses, owners, investors, managers, or supervisors to direct the work. Therefore, work occurs with minimal supervision. Priorities are identified, and results are achieved, by the input of those participants who have the most insight into what is required for the task to be done; this is coupled with the agreement and assumption of responsibility of the other participants.

Membership
The farm works in large part due to the fact that the community carefully chooses who becomes a member by a process called Clearness. After spending three weeks visiting the community, prospective members get "clear" with every single member of the community by meeting individually for in-depth conversations. Then all members meet to decide whether or not to accept that person as a provisional member. The decision, like all decisions at Acorn, is made through consensus. Thus, all members must agree to accept the person as a provisional member. Failing full consensus for acceptance, the applicant is not invited to join.

Once accepted, a person remains a provisional member for one year and then the full members decide whether or not to accept that person into full membership. Provisional membership is a trial membership and that person remains at Acorn so long as that person has the consent of all members to be there. If at any time full consent is withdrawn that person must leave.  Once that person is accepted as a full member, a full consensus is required for the community to require that person to leave.

Diet
Members of the community rotate cooking responsibilities, though cooking is done mostly by those who are experienced in it. The generally prepared meals often offer a meat dish, a number of vegetarian dishes, and maybe a vegan dish if vegans are present. The community raises and cares for chickens for meat and eggs; goats for meat and milk; and pigs for pork. Two meals per day are prepared by rotating cooks from within the community and most members attend most meals. The community does not buy factory-farmed meat and purchases much of its food organically. Acorn is also successful in rescuing food that was destined for dumpsters by working with the local food bank on redistributing their surplus produce and by working with food delivery services to rescue their surpluses.

Community service
Members of Acorn are involved in various community service activities.  These include Plant a Row (which grows food for local food pantries serving local disadvantaged persons) and Food Not Bombs.  Acorn has also invested some money and considerable labor by volunteering to help two new local egalitarian communities Living Energy Farm and Sapling.  The community also supports members who wish to pursue activism, especially as it relates to food safety and blocking the spread of GMOs including the March Against Monsanto.

Labor
Acorn has a minimum work quota of 42 hours a week, which all adult members are expected to meet.  This is the minimum amount of work deemed acceptable, with most members working well over this amount. This quantity of work may seem excessive to some, but Acorn is a relatively new farm-based community with a substantial amount of infrastructure waiting to be built out as well as a rapidly growing business that requires increasing input to meet that growth.

All work done by members is equally creditable. Almost anything that needs to be done is considered work. This includes traditionally recognized work such as office work, maintenance and farming. However, less traditionally recognized work such as childcare, cooking, cleaning, and preparing for communal parties are equally labor creditable. As a result of this system, members feel they have significantly more free time than when they were working regular jobs. Based upon meeting the minimum amount of work expected, members enjoy four weeks of vacation per year. By working over the expected quota members can accumulate additional vacation time.

The labor system at Acorn is quite unstructured. However, this does not mean members simply do whatever they want and call it work. Keeping in mind the needs and goals of the community, as well as engaging in group and individual conversations, members identify and decide on relevant tasks that need to be accomplished. Individuals then step forward to take on the responsibility of accomplishing the work in a timely fashion.

Monsanto lawsuit
Acorn, with 82 other farmers and seed businesses, preemptively sued Monsanto Corporation to protect themselves from predatory lawsuits for GMO patent infringement. This suit is between Organic Seed Growers and Trade Association and Monsanto.  This class action suit was litigated by the Public Patent Foundation in response to Monsanto's multiple lawsuits against farmers who have been contaminated by their GMO seeds.

Buildings
Living is communal rather than individuals living in their own houses. Each member is provided with his/her own bedroom in one of the four living structures.

A new building which will provide much needed space for Acorn's growing seed business is under construction (2013).  The building has a significant number of environmentally friendly features which include low impact building materials, significant southern exposure, passive ventilation for cooling, timber-frame construction technique and desiccant air conditioning for maintaining stored seed temperatures.  The estimated completion is Fall of 2014.

There are also a number of outbuildings including a wood shop, an auto shop, barns, greenhouses, seed processing facilities and long term seed storage freezers.

References

External links 
 
 Acorn Community Farm website archived 2021
 Southern Exposure Seed Exchange
 Federation of Egalitarian Communities

Egalitarian communities
Utopian communities in the United States
Vegetarian communities
Veganism
Populated places established in 1993
1993 establishments in Virginia
Populated places in Louisa County, Virginia
Intentional communities in the United States